Devin Townsend is a Canadian musician, songwriter, and record producer.

After launching his musical career in 1993 with singing effort on Vai's Sex & Religion and subsequent tour, Townsend released the album Heavy as a Really Heavy Thing under the pseudonym Strapping Young Lad, in 1995. His debut solo release was 1996's Punky Brüster – Cooked on Phonics. Townsend formed a band under the Strapping Young Lad name to perform his next album, the industrial metal album City, in 1997. Townsend started a project initially called Biomech, under the Ocean Machine moniker, to release his less metal-influenced music. It was ultimately released under his own name as 1997's Ocean Machine: Biomech. This was followed by his first charting album, the 1998 album Infinity, which appeared at number 29 in Japan. Strapping Young Lad went on hiatus at this time so that Townsend could focus on his solo music, which had a varying lineup of supporting musicians. His 2000 release Physicist reached number 80 in Japan, and was followed by the 2001 release Terria which charted in France and Japan.

In 2002, Townsend reunited Strapping Young Lad and formed a new group, The Devin Townsend Band, as a permanent fixture for recording and touring for his solo material. The two bands recorded new albums simultaneously, and released Strapping Young Lad and Accelerated Evolution, respectively, in 2003. The former was Townsend's first album to chart in the US, appearing at number 97 on Billboard'''s Top Heatseekers chart. Townsend also released a special edition of Accelerated Evolution which included an EP called Project EKO. The EP was Townsend's first foray into electronica, a genre which he explored further with Devlab in 2004. Strapping Young Lad released Alien in 2005, which charted in four countries, reaching 32 on Top Heatseekers. In 2006, both bands released their final albums, The Devin Townsend Band's Synchestra charting in three European countries and Strapping Young Lad's The New Black climbing to last place on the Billboard 200. He also released a third electronica piece, an ambient album called The Hummer.

In 2007, Townsend disbanded both Strapping Young Lad and The Devin Townsend Band to spend more time with his family and less time touring.Bowar, Chad (2006). "Strapping Young Lad Interview: A Conversation With Frontman Devin Townsend" . About.com. Retrieved June 1, 2009. That year, a solo comedic concept album, Ziltoid the Omniscient, was released. Townsend put his music on hiatus for a year, doing production work for other artists. In late 2008, he began recording a four-album series called the Devin Townsend Project, using a different musical style and band of supporting musicians for each album.Rausch, Jan (April 7, 2009). ""Video interview with Devin Townsend" . Toazted. Retrieved June 1, 2009. The first entry in the series, a relatively quiet rock album called Ki, was released in May 2009, reaching number 26 in Finland and appearing on the UK Indie and UK Rock charts. The second album in the series, a more heavy album called Addicted, was released in November 2009, reaching number 36 in Finland and number 2 on the US Heatseekers chart. The third and fourth albums in the series, a metal album called Deconstruction and a new-age album called Ghost, were released simultaneously on June 20, 2011. After the four albums Townsend decided to continue under the Devin Townsend Project moniker and released the fifth record, entitled Epicloud, on September 18, 2012. The first album in its eponymous series, Casualties of Cool, was released on May 14, 2014.Devin Townsend's Twitter The most recent studio albums include a double concept album project called Z² and seventh Devin Townsend Project album Transcendence, released on October 27, 2014 and September 9, 2016, respectively.Devin Townsend's Twitter Townsend released his latest solo album titled Empath on March 29, 2019.

Strapping Young Lad
Studio albums

Live albums

Compilation albums

Box set albums

EP albums

Video albums

 Singles and music videos 

Devin Townsend
Studio albums

Live albums

Compilation albums

Box set albums

EP albums

Video albums

Singles

Music videos

Other appearances
Devin Townsend has appeared on numerous albums outside of his solo material and Strapping Young Lad, often filling the role as the producer.

References
General

"[ Devin Townsend Discography]." Allmusic''. Macrovision Corporation. Retrieved December 8, 2008.
 

Specific

Discographies of Canadian artists
Heavy metal discographies